Dallas Roberts (born 23 August 1979 in Timaru) is a retired New Zealand sprinter.

He finished ninth in the 200 metres in the 2002 IAAF World Cup, and competed at the 2002 Commonwealth Games where he finished 8th in the second semifinal of the men's 200 metres.

He has 20.79 seconds in the 200 metres, achieved in June 2002 in Bern; and 10.46 seconds in the 100 metres, achieved in June 2002 in Luzern.

Achievements

References

1979 births
Living people
New Zealand male sprinters
Athletes (track and field) at the 2002 Commonwealth Games
Commonwealth Games competitors for New Zealand